Debbie Lynch-White (born 1986) is a Canadian film and television actress from Quebec. Most noted for her performance in the 2018 film La Bolduc in the title role as folk singer Mary Rose-Anna "La Bolduc" Travers, she was previously known for her regular supporting role as prison guard Nancy Prévost in the television series Unité 9, and will appear in the forthcoming series Le Jeu and Une autre histoire.

She received a Prix Félix nomination for Best Female Vocalist in 2018 for the soundtrack to La Bolduc, in which she performed all of her own singing,
and won the Prix Iris for Best Actress at the 21st Quebec Cinema Awards.

She has announced a touring musical show, Elle était une fois, to premiere in 2019. She also has a non-fiction book, Faut que je te parle, scheduled for publication in fall 2018.

She married Marina Gallant in 2017.

References

External links

1986 births
21st-century Canadian actresses
21st-century Canadian non-fiction writers
21st-century Canadian women writers
Canadian film actresses
Canadian television actresses
Canadian women non-fiction writers
Canadian non-fiction writers in French
French-language singers of Canada
Canadian lesbian actresses
Canadian lesbian musicians
Canadian lesbian writers
Actresses from Montreal
Singers from Montreal
Writers from Montreal
French Quebecers
Living people
21st-century Canadian women singers
20th-century Canadian LGBT people
21st-century Canadian LGBT people
Best Actress Jutra and Iris Award winners